Riverview Park is the fourth largest municipal park in Pittsburgh, Pennsylvania.

Area
Riverview Park appears to be the first park in the city of Allegheny, Pennsylvania, (which since 1907 is a part of the city of Pittsburgh). Allegheny City created it in response to the City of Pittsburgh's creation of Schenley Park. The land the Riverview Park occupies belonged to Sam Watson and was known as Watson's Farm. Mayor William M. Kennedy and the residents of Allegheny City pooled their money and purchased Watson's farm in 1894 and then donated the land to the City of Allegheny.

Changes over time
When the park first opened, it had "meadows and grassy hills" as compared to the somewhat unmanaged landscape that park visitors enjoy today. The park also had a small zoo, an elk paddock, a bear pit, a merry-go round, and an amphitheatre. Today many of these structures are gone, but a stroll into some of the now undeveloped areas of the park may have you find some of these mementos of the past. The park now has a public pool, a playground, the only equestrian (bridle) path in the City Park system, various shelters, the Allegheny Observatory, and summertime concerts and movies.

The park was listed on the National Register of Historic Places in 2021.

Images
Riverview Park Map

References

Further reading

External links 

  at Pittsburgh Department of Parks & Recreation Website]
 Riverview Park Overview at the Pittsburgh City Council Website
 Riverview Park History at Pittsburgh Parks Conservancy

1894 establishments in Pennsylvania
Parks in Pittsburgh
Urban forests in the United States
Urban public parks
National Register of Historic Places in Pittsburgh
Parks on the National Register of Historic Places in Pennsylvania